Manuel André Antonio (born 3 November 1988, in Luanda) is an Angolan middle-distance runner. At the 2012 Summer Olympics, he competed in the Men's 800 metres.  He also competed in the 800 metres at the 2013 World Championships.

References

External links
 

Angolan male middle-distance runners
1988 births
Living people
Olympic athletes of Angola
Athletes (track and field) at the 2012 Summer Olympics
World Athletics Championships athletes for Angola
People from Luanda